The News Record may refer to the following newspapers:

 News & Record, Greensboro, North Carolina
 The News Record (Cincinnati), University of Cincinnati
 News-Record (Wisconsin), Neenah, Wisconsin
 News Record, a former name of NJToday.net, New Jersey